Villem Tiideman (1884 Rapla Parish, Kreis Harrien – ?) was an Estonian politician. He was a member of I Riigikogu. He was a member of the Riigikogu since 19 October 1921. He replaced Jaan Santa. On 15 November 1921, he resigned his position and he was replaced by Jaan Leeto.

References

1884 births
Year of death missing
People from Rapla Parish
People from Kreis Harrien
Central Committee of Tallinn Trade Unions politicians
Members of the Riigikogu, 1920–1923